Easher Parker is a beauty pageant titleholder who was crowned Miss Turks and Caicos 2011 on June 8, 2011, at the Regent Palms Hotel in Grace Bay.

She represented Turks and Caicos Islands in the 2011 Miss Universe pageant in São Paulo, Brazil, on September 12, 2011. She was unplaced.

References

Living people
Turks and Caicos Islands beauty pageant winners
Miss Universe 2011 contestants
Year of birth missing (living people)